Phillip A. Washington (born 1958) is an American governmental administrator working as the CEO of Denver International Airport. He was previously CEO of the Los Angeles Metro, and served as the head of president Joe Biden's transportation transition team. In July 2022 Biden nominated Washington to serve as administrator of the Federal Aviation Administration, but Congress has delayed taking action to confirm him.

Early life and education 
Washington was born in the South Side of Chicago and lived in the Altgeld Gardens Homes. When he was 17 years old, Washington was expelled from high school and decided that the best way to get away from the place was to enlist in the United States Army.

After twenty-four years, he had risen to the rank of Command Sergeant Major, being stationed in Fort Carson, Colorado. During his time in the military, he got a Bachelor of Business Administration degree at Columbia College Chicago and a Master of Management from Webster University. In 2000, he left the army and applied for assistant general manager of administration at the Regional Transportation District (RTD). Cal Marsella, the CEO, gave him the job.

Career

RTD 
Washington began his work as assistant general manager in 2000. In June 2009, Washington was named as the interim chief after Marsella stepped down. In December 2009, the RTD announced that Washington would become the next CEO after the board voted in favor of his appointment.

LA Metro 

In May 2015, Los Angeles mayor Eric Garcetti announced that Washington would become the new CEO of the Los Angeles County Metropolitan Transportation Authority, replacing Art Leahy.

In 2018, Washington was honored at the Los Angeles Sustainability Coalition Annual Awards Dinner for his role in the Measure M expansion.

In November 2020, Washington was named Team Lead for the Joe Biden presidential transition Agency Review Team for the United States Department of Transportation. In February 2021, after informing the Metro Board not to renew or extend his contract, Washington announced he would be retiring from the post that May.

Denver International Airport 
On June 7, 2021, Denver mayor Michael Hancock nominated Washington to become the CEO of Denver International Airport, taking over the position from CEO Kim Day who was retiring after 13 years. A few days after, the Los Angeles County Sheriff's Department had a criminal investigation at LACMTA's offices related to a criminal investigation into Washington, which came after a Metro whistleblower's claims of corruption. The investigation was of Metro's sexual harassment hotline, which was found to cost more than $8,000 per call after "multiple no-bid contracts to run the service were awarded to Peace Over Violence, a charity led by a close friend and campaign donor of L.A. County Supervisor and Metro board member Sheila Kuehl." Washington maintained that he was innocent and that the complaint was from a disgruntled employee, with Hancock supporting him. The topic of the investigation was not discussed when the Denver City Council unanimously voted to approve Washington as the new CEO.

References 

American airline chief executives
Denver International Airport

1958 births
Living people
21st-century American businesspeople
African-American business executives